Or Havivyan (born 27 December 1994, in Zrahia) is an Israeli footballer who plays for Maccabi Ironi Netivot as a central midfielder.

Career
He made his debut for Hapoel Be'er Sheva against Maccabi Sha'arayim in State Cup, in January 2014.

Club career statistics
''(correct as of July 2017)

Honours
 Hapoel Be'er Sheva
 Israeli Premier League: 2013-14 (runner-up), 2015–16 (winners), 2016–17 (winners)
 Israeli State Cup: 2014-15 (runner-up)

References

1994 births
Living people
Israeli footballers
Hapoel Be'er Sheva F.C. players
Hapoel Petah Tikva F.C. players
Ironi Nesher F.C. players
Maccabi Yavne F.C. players
Maccabi Kiryat Gat F.C. players
Maccabi Ironi Netivot F.C. players
Israeli Premier League players
Liga Leumit players
Israeli people of Iranian-Jewish descent
Footballers from Southern District (Israel)
Association football midfielders